Administrative divisions of China are the political divisions of the People's Republic of China.

Administrative divisions of China may also refer to:

 History of the administrative divisions of China (disambiguation):
 History of the administrative divisions of China before 1912
 History of the administrative divisions of China (1912–1949)
 History of the administrative divisions of China (1949–present)

 Administrative divisions of the Special Administrative Regions of China
 Districts of Hong Kong
 Municipal Affairs Bureau (Macau)

See also 
 Administrative divisions of Taiwan, officially the Republic of China